Wahid Mohammed Sali (born 11 December 1982) is an Indian football player who currently player for AL SHABAB TRIPPANACHI In All India Sevens Football

Career
He joined Mumbai FC in January 2008 who earned 16 games and left in December 2008 the club to sign for the Kerala based Universal Soccer School. He is now playing for  Bhawanipore.

ONGC
He signed for newly promoted ONGC F.C. of the I-League in the 2012–2013 season began and he made his debut for the club 29 December 2012 against United Sikkim F.C. in the 13th round of the 2012–13 season coming on as a 90th-minute substitute for Robin Gurung.

Mohun Bagan
After an impressive season with ONGC, Sali was signed by Mohun Bagan A.C. He made his debut on 22 September 2013 against Bengaluru FC at the Bangalore Football Stadium in which he earned a yellow card in the 39th minute as Mohun Bagan drew the match 1-1. He was adjudged as the Man Of The Match in Mohun Bagan's away match against Churchill Brothers in Goa.

Bhawanipore
On 7 July 2015 Sali joined Bhawanipore.

Playing style
Wahid Sali is a versatile defender who can play as a right back or center back. He started as a 7's footballer in Kerala and is regarded as one of the best defenders in I-League presently. He believes that a player should seek ways to improve his game and his hardworking nature on and off the pitch is the reason behind his success.

Career statistics

Club
Statistics accurate as of 11 May 2013

References

1985 births
Indian footballers
Living people
Mumbai FC players
Association football defenders
I-League players
ONGC FC players
Mohun Bagan AC players
Footballers from Kerala